Paris Lockdown is a 2007 French crime film directed by Frédéric Schoendoerffer.

Cast 
 Benoît Magimel - Franck 
 Philippe Caubère - Corti
 Béatrice Dalle - Béatrice 
 Olivier Marchal - Jean-Guy
 Mehdi Nebbou - Hicham
 Tomer Sisley - Larbi
 Ludovic Schoendoerffer - Ricky
 Anne Marivin - Laure

References

External links

2000s crime films
French crime drama films
Films directed by Frédéric Schoendoerffer
2000s French films